The George Price Centre for Peace and Development is a not-for-profit/non-governmental organization, established in 2000 through the collaborative effort of a group of admirers in honor of the Right Honorable George Cadle Price, P.C. (Jan. 15, 1919 – Sept. 19, 2011) - Belize’s first Prime Minister and National Hero. The Centre was officially inaugurated on September 21, 2002 and opened to the public on January 15, 2004. It is located on Price Centre Road in Belmopan, Belize.

Goal & Vision

“The George Price Centre for Peace and Development was established in honor of the Right Honorable George Price and his lifelong devotion to the peaceful construction and development of Belize and its people.  

The aim of the Centre is to inspire more Belizeans, regardless of race, color or political persuasion to carry on this endeavor. We aspire to be a venue where people can share and improve individual abilities and community spirit through study, dialogue, debate, expression of the arts, among other.  

It is the vision of the Centre that these processes of self-development will empower more people to work together for the growth and advancement of Belize, free from civil strife and disparities.”

Functions of the George Price Centre

The functions of the Centre are multifaceted and are geared towards achieving the overall goal of promoting the peaceful development of Belize and its people, through education, training, and dissemination of information and the promotion of the arts. The Centre functions as:
 a museum
 a resource/educational centre and library
 a training centre 
 a cultural centre
 a business centre

References

External links
 The George Price Centre For Peace And Development

Organisations based in Belize
2004 establishments in Belize